Kenyon Ezra Giese (December 21, 1933August 7, 1975) was an American dairy farmer and Republican politician.  He was elected to three terms in the Wisconsin State Assembly, representing Sauk County, but died of cancer in the first year of his third term.

Biography
Giese was born on December 21, 1933.  He earned his bachelor's degree from the University of Wisconsin-Madison in 1955. From 1957 to 1959, he served in the United States Army.

Political career
Giese was elected to the Assembly in 1970 and reelected in 1972 and 1974. He was a Republican. He died in office on August 7, 1975, following surgery for a brain tumor. He is buried at Bethlehem United Methodist Church Cemetery in Black Hawk, Wisconsin.

References

Military personnel from Wisconsin
United States Army soldiers
University of Wisconsin–Madison alumni
1933 births
1975 deaths
20th-century American politicians
Republican Party members of the Wisconsin State Assembly